Desnianskyi District is an administrative raion (district or borough) of the city of Kyiv, the capital of Ukraine. It is located in the north-eastern part of the city on the Left Bank of the Dnieper River and is the most populous district of Kyiv. It is also the second largest district, with the total area of ca. 14.2 ha.

Desnianskyi District mainly consists of two microdistricts – Troieshchyna and Lisovyi – making it predominantly residential in nature. There is only one clear-cut, (yet small) industrial zone called Kulykove on the border with Dniprovskyi Raion. This fact explains why the district has the lowest number of registered business entities among Kyiv raions. Much like commuter town, therefore, Desnianskyi District has very little commercial or industrial activity beyond a small amount of retail, oriented toward serving the locals. However, it differs from commuter towns in that it forms part of the city proper and is not regarded as suburb in a classical sense. Still, its currently weak transportation links with the major part of the city on the Right Bank make it appear as a "city inside a city", which is especially true for Troieshchyna microdistrict.

History
The first written reference of the lands that today form part of Desnianskyi District dates back to 1667. Until 1927 the area of the raion belonged to the Oster uyezd of the Chernigov Governorate. Since then it became part of the city of Kyiv. In 1932 the area was reorganized under the Petriv (Podil) Raion. It was not until 1987 when the area was reorganized into a separate raion partially out of the neighboring Dnipro Raion and was named as the Vatutin Raion.

Troieshchyna
Residential development of what would become known as Troieshchyna microdistrict started in 1966. However it was not until the completion of Pivnichnyi Bridge (named Moskovskyi Bridge until 2018) in 1976 that the development became genuinely large-scale.

Gallery

Notes

a.  
Resident population as of 1 January 2009.

b.  
Informally, Kyiv is subdivided into the Right Bank and the Left bank on the west and east bank of the Dnieper river respectively.

References

External links
 Kyiv City Council Official Webportal 
 Kyiv City Council Official forum 

Urban districts of Kyiv